Lincoln Park School, also known as Addor Community Center, is a historic Rosenwald School located near Pinebluff, Moore County, North Carolina. It was built in 1922, and is a one-story, four bay by three bay, side-gabled, weatherboarded, rectangular building in the Bungalow / American Craftsman style. It was built as a four teacher school. It was decommissioned as a school in 1949, and the building serves as the Addor Community Center.

It was added to the National Register of Historic Places in 1997.

References

Rosenwald schools in North Carolina
School buildings on the National Register of Historic Places in North Carolina
School buildings completed in 1922
Buildings and structures in Moore County, North Carolina
National Register of Historic Places in Moore County, North Carolina
1922 establishments in North Carolina